Afghanistan–Pakistan relations refer to the bilateral ties between Afghanistan and the Islamic Republic of Pakistan. In August 1947, the partition of British India led to the emergence of Pakistan along Afghanistan's eastern frontier, and the two countries have since had a strained relationship; Afghanistan was the sole country to vote against Pakistan's admission into the United Nations following the latter's independence. Various Afghan government officials and Afghan nationalists have made irredentist claims to large swathes of Pakistan's territory in modern-day Khyber Pakhtunkhwa and Pakistani Balochistan, which complete the traditional homeland of "Pashtunistan" for the Pashtun people. Afghan territorial claims over Pashtun-majority areas that are in Pakistan were coupled with discontent over the permanency of the Durand Line, for which Afghanistan demanded a renegotiation, with the aim of having it shifted eastward to the Indus River. Territorial disputes and conflicting claims prevented the normalization of bilateral ties between the two countries throughout the mid-20th century. Further Afghanistan–Pakistan tensions have arisen concerning a variety of issues, including the Afghanistan conflict and Afghan refugees in Pakistan, water-sharing rights, and a continuously warming relationship between Afghanistan and India.

Shortly after Pakistani independence, Afghanistan materially supported the failed armed secessionist movement headed by Mirzali Khan against Pakistan. Afghanistan's immediate support of secessionist movements within Pakistan prevented normalised ties from emerging between the two states.

In 1952 the government of Afghanistan published a tract in which it laid claim not only to Pashtun territory within Pakistan, but also to the Pakistani province of Balochistan. Diplomatic relations were cut off between 1961 and 1963 after Afghanistan supported more armed separatists in Pakistan, leading to skirmishes between the two states earlier in 1960, and Pakistan's subsequent closure of the port of Karachi to Afghan transit trade. Mohammed Daoud Khan became President of Afghanistan in 1973, Afghanistan—with Soviet support—again pursued a policy of arming Pashtun separatists within Pakistan.

In 2017, the Pakistani military have accused Afghanistan of sheltering various terrorist groups which launch attacks into Pakistan, while Afghan authorities have blamed Pakistan's intelligence agency, the ISI, for funding warlords and the Taliban, and for basing terrorist camps within Pakistani territory to target Afghanistan. There is considerable amount of anti-Pakistan sentiment in Afghanistan, while negative sentiment towards the Afghan refugees is widespread in Pakistan, even in Pashtun-dominated regions.

However, former Afghan President Hamid Karzai (in office 2004–2014) has described Pakistan and Afghanistan as "inseparable brothers" along with that he alleged that Pakistan uses terrorism against Afghanistan, which is due to the historical, religious, and ethnolinguistic connections between the Pashtun people and other ethnic groups of both countries, as well as to trade and other ties. Each of the two countries features amongst the other's largest trading partners, and Pakistan serves as a major conduit for transit trade involving landlocked Afghanistan. Both countries are member states of the Organisation of Islamic Cooperation, Economic Cooperation Organization and South Asian Association for Regional Cooperation.

Since 2021, in a bid to improve bilateral ties, Pakistan has contributed $1 billion for the reconstruction of war-torn Afghanistan by building hospitals, schools and roads, along with providing 14945 tonnes of humanitarian aid.

Historical context

Southern and eastern Afghanistan is predominately Pashto-speaking, like the adjacent Khyber-Pakhtunkhwa, Federally Administered Tribal Areas, and northern Balochistan regions in Pakistan. This entire area is inhabited by the indigenous Pashtuns who belong to different Pashtun tribes. The Pashtuns were known as (Pathans in Pakistan and India) and have lived in this region for thousands of years, since at least the 1st millennium BC.

The Durand Line border was established after the 1893 Durand Line Agreement between Mortimer Durand of colonial British India and Amir Abdur Rahman Khan of Afghanistan for fixing the limit of their respective spheres of influence. The single-page agreement, which contained seven short articles, was signed by Durand and Khan, agreeing not to exercise political interference beyond the frontier line between Afghanistan and what was then the British Indian Empire.

Shortly after the demarcation of the Durand Line, the British began connecting the region on its side of Durand line to the vast and expansive Indian railway network. Concurrently, the Afridi tribesmen began to rise up in arms against the British, creating a zone of instability between Peshawar and the Durand Line. As a result, travel across the boundary was almost entirely halted, and the Pashtun tribes living under the British rule began to orient themselves eastward in the direction of the Indian railways. By the time of the Indian independence movement, prominent Pashtun nationalists such as Abdul Ghaffar Khan advocated unity with the nearly formed Dominion of India, and not a united Afghanistan – highlighting the extent to which infrastructure and instability began to erode the Pashtun self-identification with Afghanistan. By the time of the Pakistan independence movement, popular opinion among Pashtuns was in support of joining the Dominion of Pakistan.

Pakistan inherited the Durand Line agreement after its independence in 1947 but there has never been a formal agreement or ratification between Islamabad and Kabul. The Afghan government has not formally accepted the Durand Line as the international border between the two states, claiming that the Durand Line Agreement has been void in the past. This complicated issue is very sensitive to both the countries. The Afghan government worried that if it ever ratified the agreement, it would've permanently divided the 50 million Pashtuns and thus create a backlash in Afghanistan. Pakistan felt that the border issue had been resolved before its birth in 1947. This unmanagable border has always served as the main trade route between Afghanistan and the South Asia, especially for supplies into Afghanistan.

Shortly after Pakistan gained independence in 1947, Afghanistan crafted a two-fold strategy to destabilize the frontier regions of Pakistan, in an attempt to take advantage of Pakistan's post-independence instability. Firstly, it strongly aligned itself with Pakistan's rival, India, and also the USSR. Secondly, it politically and financially backed secessionist politicians in the Khyber Pakhtunkhwa in the 1960s. In January 1950, the Afghan king, Mohammed Zahir Shah, had an anti-Pakistan speech which was condemned by Pakistan's Liaquat Ali Khan. A serious incident took place on September 30, 1950, when Pakistan claimed Afghan troops had crossed into their territory near the Bogra Pass as a low-scale invasion. The Afghan government denied involvement, saying they were pro-Pashtunistan tribesmen. Zahir Shah mentioned in a 1952 speech the friendly feelings towards Pakistan, but that the Pashtunistan issue cannot be ignored. The 1954 military pact between Pakistan and the United States concerned Afghanistan and India, and it brought Afghanistan closer to the Soviet Union but whilst maintaining non-alignment.

The Afghan government denounced the merger of West Pakistan provinces, and on March 30, 1955, Afghan demonstrators attacked the Pakistani embassy and consulates in Kabul, Kandahar and Jalalabad. Pakistan retaliated by closing the border, an economic blockage. Diplomatic relations were restored in September. Again due to the Pashtunistan issue, the two countries accused each other of border mispractices in 1961. In August, the consulates in both countries closed and relations were broken in September 1961. The situation was not defused until about 1965.

Afghanistan's policies placed a severe strain upon Pakistan–Afghan relations in the 1960s, up until the 1970s, when the Pashtunistan movement largely subsided as the population came to identify with Pakistan. The Pashtun assimilation into the Pakistani state followed years of rising Pashtun influence in Pakistani politics and the nation's bureaucracy, culminating in Ayub Khan, Yahya Khan, Ishaq Khan – all Pashtuns, attaining leadership of Pakistan. The largest nationalist party of the time, the Awami National Party (ANP), dropped its secessionist agenda and embraced the Pakistani state, leaving only a small Pakhtunkhwa Millat Party to champion the cause of independence in relation to both Pakistan and Afghanistan. Despite the weaknesses of the early secessionist movement, this period in history continues to negatively influence Pakistani-Afghan relations in the 21st century, in addition to the province's politics.

Confederation proposal

In order to solve the disputes, mainly centered around the borders issue with the Durand line, Khurshid Mahmud Kasuri, a veteran diplomat who served as the Minister of Foreign Affairs of Pakistan (2002–2007), says that "at one time serious efforts were made at government level for an Afg–Pak Confederation", precising that these initiatives were taken during the time of President Mohammed Daoud Khan, generally considered to be anti-Pakistan for his galvanization of the Pashtunistan issue. Aslam Khattak, a politician who also served as an ambassador to Afghanistan, talked about this process in his book A Pathan Odyssey, and says that Prime Minister Malik Firoz Khan Noon and President Iskandar Mirza both agreed with the plans, the former also agreeing to take King Zahir Shah "as the constitutional Head of State", proclaiming that "after all, for some time after independence, we had a Christian Queen (Elizabeth II). Now, we would have a Muslim man!’." As per Kasuri, the United States supported the idea as well. He blames the failure of the project to the assassination of Daud Khan and the advent, in 1978, of the pro-Soviet PDPA party and Nur Muhammad Taraki.

Afghan scholar Hafizullah Emadi says that "the initial blueprint suggested that both sides would maintain their internal autonomy, but in the matter of defense, foreign policy, foreign trade and communication, there would be a central government. The prime minister would be by rotation." He also explains the failure of the proposition : Iskandar Mirza was replaced by General Ayub Khan, after a coup d'état in 1958, an ethnic Pashtun who "regarded himself as the leader of the Pashtuns in Pakistan, and believed that the Pashtuns in Afghanistan should join Pakistan under his leadership" instead of a confederation. Zulfiqar Ali Bhutto rejected the idea because "an economically underdeveloped Afghanistan would not benefit Pakistan." In his diaries, in an observation dated to 9 January 1967, Ayub Khan noted that "it is people from the Punjab like Feroz Khan Noon and Amjad Ali who keep on emphasizing to me the need to make up with Afghanistan."

President Zia-ul-Haq too was for such confederation. "Charles Wilson recalled a map that Zia had also shown to him in which overlay indicated the goal of a confederation embracing first Pakistan and Afghanistan and eventually Central Asia and Kashmir. Zia further explained about the Pakistan-Afghanistan confederation in which Pakistanis and Afghans could travel freely back and forth without passports." General Akhtar Abdur Rahman, considered Zia's right-hand man and more importantly the DG-ISI (1979–1987), himself a Pashtun, "also shared Zia’s vision of a post-Soviet "Islamic Confederation" composed of Pakistan, Afghanistan, Kashmir and even the states of Soviet Central Asia."

Even more than a confederation, recently declassified CIA documents point out that, in 1954, the Afghan government approached the US in order to have a merger with Pakistan, being threatened by the Soviet Union's economic envelopment. Pakistan's then Prime Minister Mohammad Ali Bogra was skeptical of a total merger, but the idea of a confederation in itself, on the other hand, was already floating around, as "the CIA report hinted that there had been some talk in Afghan and Pakistani official circles of some sort of confederation."

Some analysts have noted that present-day Pakistan and Afghanistan have already been amalgamated into a single geographical unit during the Durrani Empire (1747–1826). For instance, scholar Muhammad Shamsuddin Siddiqi  says that "Ahmed Shah's empire with its power base in Kandahar, and later transferred to Kabul, incorporated Kashmir, Punjab, Sind and Baluchistan" and thus "the Durrani empire bears the closest resemblance to Pakistan", while others have noted that "since the Durrani Empire included the present-day Pakistan and Afghanistan, the forces of history, the principle of national self-determination, and the aspiration for the unity of Muslim Ummah have all come into line", explaining the interconnected geopolitics of both countries, its latest example being the AfPak doctrine, theorized under the Obama administration from 2008 onward, concluding that Afghanistan and Pakistan should be the aim of common security policies considering their similarities.

Contemporary era

Relations between Afghanistan and Pakistan began deteriorating again in the 1970s when Afghanistan hosted Pashtun-Baluch militants operating against Pakistan under the leadership of National Awami Party led by Abdul Wali Khan and in retaliation Pakistan started supporting Islamist movements against the progressive and Soviet-influenced Afghan government of Mohammed Daoud Khan, and encouraged the Islamists to rise up against the government. The figures included Gulbuddin Hekmatyar and Ahmad Shah Massoud-both members of the Jamiat-e Islami students' political society- and the Haqqanis. In April 1978, Afghan President Daoud Khan was assassinated in Kabul during the self-declared Marxist Saur Revolution. This was followed by the execution of deposed Pakistani Prime Minister Zulfikar Ali Bhutto in April 1979 and the assassination of Afghan leader Nur Muhammad Taraki in September 1979. After the Soviet invasion of Afghanistan in December 1979, the United States joined Pakistan to counter Soviet influence and advance its own interests in the region. In turn, Afghan, Indian and Soviet intelligence agencies played their role by supporting al-Zulfikar – a Pakistani leftist terrorist group responsible for the March 1981 hijacking of a Pakistan International Airlines (PIA) plane. Al-Zulfiqar was a Pakistani left-wing organisation formed in 1977 by Mir Murtaza Bhutto, son of former Pakistani Prime Minister Zulfikar Ali Bhutto. Its goal was to overthrow the military regime that ousted Bhutto. After March 1981 Al-Zulfiqar claimed no further attacks. The Bhutto family and Pakistani military dictator Zia-ul-Haq shared a common enemy, as Zia was the one supporting attacks against the Afghan government.

During the 1980s, the Durand Line was heavily used by Afghan refugees fleeing the Soviet occupation in Afghanistan, including a large number of Mujahideen insurgent groups who crossed back and forth. Pakistan became a major training ground for roughly 250,000 foreign mujahideen fighters who began crossing into Afghanistan on a daily basis to wage war against the communist Afghanistan and the Soviet forces. The mujahideen included not only locals but also Arabs and others from over 40 different Islamic nations. Many of these foreign fighters married local women and decided to stay in Pakistan, among them were radical Muslims such those of Saudi-led Al-Qaeda and Egyptian Muslim Brotherhood as well as prisoners from Arab countries. Relations between the two countries remained hostile during the Soviet-Afghan War. Afghan leader Babrak Karmal refused to improve relations with Pakistan due to their refusal to formally recognize the PDPA government.

Following the death of Pakistani President Zia-ul-Haq in 1988, U.S. State Department blamed the WAD (a KGB created Afghan secret intelligence agency) for terrorist attacks inside Pakistan in 1987 and 1988. With funds from the international community channeled through the United Nations High Commissioner for Refugees (UNHCR), Pakistan hosted over 3 million Afghans at various refugee camps, mainly around Peshawar in Khyber Pakhtunkhwa. The United States and others provided billions of dollars in humanitarian assistance to the refugees. There were no regular schools provided for the refugees but only madrasas in which students were trained to become members of the Taliban movement. When the Soviet Union began leaving Afghanistan, during the Presidency of Mohammad Najibullah, the UNHCR and the international community assisted 1.5 million Afghan refugees in returning to Afghanistan. Pakistan were also thought to have played a part in the attempted coup in 1990 against Najibullah's government.

Although the victorious mujahideen formed a government in 1992 through the Peshawar Accords, Pakistan remained unhappy with new leaders Rabbani and Massoud, including their foreign policy of maintaining friendly relations with India as during the communist era. Pushing for a "trusted" friendly government in Afghanistan, the Pakistani intelligence started funding Hekmatyar-the only mujahideen commander not to sign the Accords-to fight against the new Afghan government in hopes that he would win and install a new government. Through Pakistani funding, Hekmatyar's forces sieged Kabul city with thousands of rockets for three years, killing thousands. However, upon realizing that Hekmatyar was unable to take power in Kabul, Pakistan looked elsewhere. The Taliban movement had just formed with the help of then-Pakistani Interior Minister, Naseerullah Babar, and the Pakistani intelligence threw its weight behind the new movement. Around September 1994, the Taliban movement captured the Afghan city of Kandahar and began its long conquest with help from Pakistan. The Taliban claimed that they wanted to clean Afghanistan from the warlords and criminals. According to Pakistan and Afghanistan expert Ahmed Rashid, "between 1994 and 1999, an estimated few Pakistanis volunteers trained and fought in Afghanistan" keeping the Taliban regime in power. The role of the Pakistani military during that time has been described by some international observers as a "creeping invasion" of Afghanistan. UN documents also reveal the role of Arab and Pakistani support troops in the Taliban massacre campaigns.

In late 1996, the Islamic Emirate of Afghanistan emerged and established close relations with neighbouring Pakistan. However, the relations began to decline when the Taliban refused to endorse the Durand Line despite pressure from Islamabad, arguing that there shall be no borders among Muslims. A discussion over the Durrand Line between the-then Taliban leader Mohammed Omar and Naseerullah Babar ended abruptly. Omar called Babar, who was an ethnic Pashtun, a traitor for saying that "all problems would be resolved" should the Durrand Line be recognised by the Taliban government.

When the Islamic Emirate of Afghanistan was toppled and the new Afghan government was formed, President Hamid Karzai began repeating the previous Taliban statement.

The Karzai administration in Afghanistan has close relations with the Pakistan's Awami National Party (ANP) and the Pakistan Peoples Party (PPP). In 2006, Afghan President Hamid Karzai warned that "Iran and Pakistan and others are not fooling anyone" when it comes to interfering in his country. 

The Durand Line border has been used in the last decade as the main supply route for NATO-led forces in Afghanistan as well as by Taliban insurgents and other militant groups who stage attacks inside Afghanistan. The American government decided to rely on drone attacks, which began to negatively affect the US-Pakistan relations.

In 2007, Afghan intelligence captured Muhammad Hanif, the Taliban spokesman. During his interrogation which was recorded, Hanif claimed that the Taliban leader was being kept in Quetta under the protection of the ISI. Pakistan denied the claims.

Relations have become more strained after the Afghan government began openly accusing Pakistan of using its ISI spy network in aiding the Taliban and other militants. Pakistan usually denies these allegations but has said in the past that it does not have full control of the actions of the ISI. There have been a number of reports about the Afghanistan–Pakistan skirmishes, which usually occur when army soldiers are in hot pursuit chasing insurgents who cross the border back and forth. This leads to tensions between the two states, especially after hearing reports of civilian casualties.

After the May 2011 death of Osama bin Laden in Pakistan, many prominent Afghan figures began being assassinated, including Mohammed Daud Daud, Ahmad Wali Karzai, Jan Mohammad Khan, Ghulam Haider Hamidi, Burhanuddin Rabbani and others. Also in the same year, the Afghanistan–Pakistan skirmishes intensified and many large scale attacks by the Pakistani-based Haqqani network took place across Afghanistan. This led to the United States warning Pakistan of a possible military action against the Haqqanis in the Federally Administered Tribal Areas. The U.S. blamed Pakistan's government, mainly Pakistani Army and its ISI spy network as the masterminds behind all of this.  U.S. Ambassador to Pakistan, Cameron Munter, told Radio Pakistan that "the attack that took place in Kabul a few days ago, that was the work of the Haqqani network. There is evidence linking the Haqqani Network to the Pakistan government. This is something that must stop." Other top U.S. officials such as Hillary Clinton and Leon Panetta made similar statements. Despite all of this, Afghan President Hamid Karzai labelled Pakistan as Afghanistan's "twin brother".

After the May 2017 Kabul attack, the Afghan National Directorate of Security (NDS) claimed that the blast was planned by the Afghan insurgent group Haqqani Network, and reiterated allegations that those elements had support and presence across the border in Pakistan. Afghan President Ashraf Ghani stated that Pakistan has instigated an "undeclared war of aggression" against the country. Pakistan's Foreign Ministry spokesman, Nafees Zakaria rejected the Afghan allegations as "baseless".

In 2015, Inter-Services Intelligence and National Directorate of Security inked a memorandum of understanding. Under the memorandum of understanding, both nations agreed to fight terrorism together and also to share intelligence information. On 16 May 2015, the Pakistani army launched an operation to save the life of an injured Afghan soldier on the Afghanistan side of the border. The soldier was injured in a clash with militants and he was evacuated by the Pakistan military. There have been instances where Afghan soldiers injured in fighting the militants near the Pakistan Afghanistan border are sent to Pakistan for treatment.

After fall of Kabul by Afghan Taliban, Pakistani PM Imran Khan describing it as Afghans breaking "the shackles of slavery". Although Pakistan still not officially recognition of the Taliban's Islamic Emirate, it launched a diplomatic effort urging the international community to engage with the Taliban, help ease Afghanistan's humanitarian crisis and prevent it from descending into chaos again. In December 2021, foreign ministers of the 56 nations belonging to the Organization of Islamic Cooperation, along with Taliban delegates, gathered in Islamabad. The meeting focused on Afghanistan's humanitarian crisis. But Tehreek-e-Taliban Pakistan attacks lead to growing tension between the Afghan Taliban and Pakistan.

In April 2022, Islamabad urged Kabul "to secure Pak-Afghan Border region and take stern actions against the individuals involved in terrorist activities in Pakistan", and Pakistan Air Force conducted air raids across its border with Afghanistan, claiming to strike TTP militants operating in the porous border regions.

In late 2022, Pakistan's embassy in Kabul came under attack with gunfire wounding a Pakistani security guard, IS-K claims responsibility for the attack, Pakistan asked the attack to be thoroughly probed by Taliban authorities.

Afghan-Pak Transit Trade Agreement

In July 2010, a Memorandum of understanding (MoU) was reached between Pakistan and Afghanistan for the Afghan-Pak Transit Trade Agreement (APTTA), which was observed by U.S. Secretary of State Hillary Clinton. The two states also signed an MoU for the construction of rail tracks in Afghanistan to connect with Pakistan Railways (PR), which has been in the making since at least 2005. In October 2010, the landmark APTTA agreement was signed by Pakistani Commerce Minister Makhdoom Amin Fahim and Anwar ul-Haq Ahady, Afghan Ministry of Commerce. The ceremony was attended by Richard Holbrooke, U.S. Special Representative for Afghanistan and Pakistan, and a number of foreign ambassadors, Afghan parliamentarians and senior officials. The APTTA allows Afghan trucks to drive inside Pakistan to the Wagah border with India, including to the port cities of Karachi and Gwadar.

In November 2010, the two states formed a joint chamber of commerce to expand trade relations and solve the problems traders face. The APTTA agreement has taken effect after several Afghan trucks delivered fruits from Afghanistan to the Wagah border with India in June 2011. With the completion of the APTTA, the United States and other NATO states are planning to revive the ancient Silk Road. This is to help the local economies of Afghanistan and Pakistan by connecting South Asia with Central Asia and the Middle East. The APTTA is intended to improve trade between the two countries but Pakistan often delays Afghan-bound containers, especially after the 2011 NATO attack in Pakistan.

In July 2012, Afghanistan and Pakistan agreed to extend APTTA to Tajikistan in what will be the first step for the establishment of a North–South trade corridor. The proposed agreement will provide facilities to Tajikistan to use Pakistan's Gwadar and Karachi ports for its imports and exports while Pakistan will enjoy trade with Tajikistan under terms similar to the transit arrangement with Afghanistan. Trade between Pakistan and Afghanistan is expected to reach $5 billion by 2015. Afghanistan's economy is one of the fastest growing economies in the world. A 2012 World Bank report added, "In contrast, Afghanistan’s economy grew robustly by about 11 percent mostly due to a good harvest."

Towards the end of the same year, both the governments of Afghanistan and Pakistan drafted plans to talk to the Taliban.

Cooperation between the two countries includes possible defence cooperation and intelligence sharing as well as further enhancing the two-way trade and abolishment of visas for diplomats from the two nations.

See also

 List of ambassadors of Afghanistan to Pakistan
 Afghanistan–Pakistan sports rivalries
 Foreign relations of Afghanistan
 Foreign relations of Pakistan
 AfPak
 Durand Line
 Khyber Pass Economic Corridor
 South Asian Association for Regional Cooperation (SAARC)

References

Further reading

Abbas, Hassan. The Taliban Revival: Violence and Extremism on the Pakistan-Afghanistan Frontier (Yale UP, 2014)
 Gartenstein-Ross, Daveed, and Tara Vassefi. "The forgotten history of Afghanistan-Pakistan relations." Yale Journal of International Affairs 7 (2012): 38+ online
 Hussain, Rizwan.  Pakistan and the Emergence of Islamic Militancy in Afghanistan  (Ashgate, 2005), excerpt
 Nadiri, Khalid Homayun. "Old Habits, New Consequences: Pakistan's Posture toward Afghanistan since 2001." International Security 39.2 (2014): 132–168. online
 Paliwal, Avinash. "Pakistan–Afghanistan Relations Since 2001." in Pakistan at the Crossroads ed by Christophe Jaffrelot; (Columbia UP, 2016) pp. 191–218.
 Rashid, Ahmed. Pakistan on the Brink: The future of Pakistan, Afghanistan and the West (Penguin, 2012).
 Raza, Muhammad Amjad, and Ghulam Mustufa. "Indo-Afghan Relations: Implications for Pakistan." Central Asia 84.Summer (2019): 53–79. online
 Shahrani, M Nazif, ed. Modern Afghanistan: The Impact of 40 Years of War (Indiana UP, 2018)
 Siddique, Abubakar. The Pashtun Question The Unresolved Key to the Future of Pakistan and Afghanistan (Hurst, 2014)
 Zahab, Mariam Abou, and Olivier Roy. Islamist Networks: The Afghan-Pakistan Connection (Columbia UP, 2004)
 Former British Commander Cautions Taliban May Get Control of Pakistan Nuclear Weapons
 Pakistan-Afghanistan Nuclear Sectarian Policy emerges after Benazir Bhutto Nuclear Sectarian policy with Iran leaks
 Pakistan Ranked 1st in Muslim Countries Nuclear Business
 Afghanistan, Pakistan as chef, logistics driver for drugs
 Afghanistan-Pakistan Drug Trafficking and Aviation Business
 Afghanistan-Pakistan Drug Sales in International Airports

 
Pakistan
Bilateral relations of Pakistan